The Smaller the Grape, the Sweeter the Wine is an album by the folk rock band Tiny Lights, released in 1997 through Bar/None Records. It was the band's final album. Jerry Harrison contributed vocals to "Maybe You Will Listen".

Critical reception
Stereo Review concluded that "what's notable isn't just the range of styles—bubblegum pop, progressive/art rock, vintage soul, psychedelia—but the unaffected and warm-hearted way it all comes together."

Track listing

Personnel 

Tiny Lights
 Andy Burton – piano, organ, mellotron
 Donna Croughn – vocals, violin, drums, production
 Andy Demos – saxophone, percussion
 Dave Dreiwitz – bass guitar, trumpet
 John Hamilton – guitar, vocals, production
 Ron Howten - drums
 Kevin Sztam – trombone

Additional musicians and production
 Jerry Harrison – additional vocals
 James Mastro – production

References 

1997 albums
Bar/None Records albums
Tiny Lights albums